Tore Helge Larsen (22 December 1945 – 1 January 2015) was a Norwegian harness racer.

He won 2072 races during his career, which lasted from the 1960s to 2001. He grew up in Ekeberg, Oslo. He died from cancer on New Year's Day in 2015.

References

1945 births
2015 deaths
Sportspeople from Oslo
Norwegian harness racers
Deaths from cancer in Norway